Joaquim Henrique Pereira Silva (born 28 December 1998), known as Joaquim Henrique or just Joaquim, is a Brazilian footballer who plays as a central defender for Santos.

Club career

Early career
Born in Nova Era, Minas Gerais, Joaquim played for URT as a youth, being a part of the first team squad during the 2018 Série D, but never playing a single first team minute. Ahead of the 2019 season, he moved to a Campeonato Paulista Segunda Divisão club, but was released in two days, and then signed for Paulista in the same division.

After winning the Paulista Segunda Divisão, Joaquim moved to Murici in July 2020. On 21 September of that year, he signed for São José-SP, and also won the fourth division of the Paulista with the club.

On 3 February 2021, Joaquim agreed to a deal with Botafogo-PB. He only played two Copa do Nordeste matches for the side before leaving.

Cuiabá
On 5 May 2021, Joaquim signed a contract with Série A side Cuiabá until the end of 2023. He was initially assigned to the under-23 squad, before being loaned out to Botafogo-SP on 3 January 2022.

Joaquim returned to Cuiabá on 4 April 2022, being definitely assigned to the main squad. He made his Série A debut on 18 June, starting in a 0–0 home draw against Ceará. On 3 August, after becoming a starter, he renewed his contract until December 2026.

Joaquim scored his first goal in the top tier on 3 July 2022, netting the winner in a 2–1 away success over Avaí. He finished the 2022 season as an undisputed starter, as Cuiabá avoided relegation.

Santos
On 8 February 2023, Joaquim was announced at fellow top tier side Santos, signing a four-year contract. Santos bought 60% of his economic rights for a fee of € 3 million. He made his debut for the club eight days later, starting in a 1–1 Campeonato Paulista away draw against Santo André.

Joaquim scored his first goal on 23 February 2023, netting the winner in a 1–0 away success against Ceilândia, for the year's Copa do Brasil.

Personal life
Joaquim's younger brother Matheus Emiliano is also a footballer. A goalkeeper, he began his career with Palmas.

Career statistics

Honours
Paulista
Campeonato Paulista Segunda Divisão: 2019

São José-SP
Campeonato Paulista Segunda Divisão: 2020

References

1998 births
Living people
Sportspeople from Minas Gerais
Brazilian footballers
Association football defenders
Campeonato Brasileiro Série A players
Paulista Futebol Clube players
Murici Futebol Clube players
São José Esporte Clube players
Botafogo Futebol Clube (PB) players
Cuiabá Esporte Clube players
Botafogo Futebol Clube (SP) players
Santos FC players